Marquis Xiao of Jin, ancestral name Ji (姬), given name Ping (平), was the thirteenth ruler of the state of Jin. He was also the third ruler of Jin in the Spring and Autumn period. He ruled for sixteen years.

In 739 BC, the 7th year of the reign of Marquis Zhao of Jin, a Jin official named Panfu (潘父) murdered Marquis Zhao of Jin and welcomed Uncle Huan of Quwo to ascend the throne of Jin. He accepted Panfu's welcome and entered Jin. When he entered, the Jin people brought troops to stop him from entering. He lost and receded back to Quwo. Then, the Jin people asked the son of Marquis Zhao of Jin, Ping, to ascend the throne and he became the next ruler of Jin: Marquis Xiao of Jin. After he ascended the throne, he killed Panfu in revenge for his father.

In 724 BC, the 15th year of his reign, the son of Uncle Huan of Quwo, Count Zhuang of Quwo, murdered Marquis Xiao of Jin while in the capital of Jin, Yi (翼). Then, Jin troops attacked Count Zhuang of Quwo so he retreated back to Quwo. The Jin people asked the son of Marquis Xiao of Jin, Xi, to become the next ruler of Jin and he became Marquis E of Jin.

Monarchs of Jin (Chinese state)
8th-century BC Chinese monarchs
724 BC deaths
Year of birth unknown
8th-century BC murdered monarchs
Assassinated Chinese politicians